Olympic Legacy Plaza is a public plaza in The Gateway shopping center in Salt Lake City, Utah, United States.

Description
The plaza opened in 2001, ahead of the 2002 Winter Olympics. It features a large fountain and walls with inscriptions displaying the names of Team 2002 volunteers. Go for the Gold is also installed in the plaza.

Construction of the plaza was partly funded by a "buy a brick" program.

See also
 Olympic and Paralympic Cauldron Plaza (Salt Lake City)

References

External links

2002 Winter Olympics
Parks in Salt Lake City
Squares in the United States